Karol Dziwisz (14 June 1911 – 22 October 1982) was a Polish footballer. He played in two matches for the Poland national football team from 1933 to 1934.

References

External links
 

1911 births
1982 deaths
Polish footballers
Poland international footballers
Place of birth missing
Association football forwards
Ruch Chorzów players